Samuel Douglas McEnery (May 28, 1837 – June 28, 1910) served as the 30th Governor of the U.S. state of Louisiana, with service from 1881 until 1888. He was subsequently a U.S. senator from 1897 until 1910. He was the brother of John McEnery, one of the candidates in the contested 1872 election for governor.

Early life

McEnery was born in Monroe in Ouachita Parish in North Louisiana. He attended Spring Hill College in Mobile, Alabama, the United States Naval Academy in Annapolis, Maryland, and the University of Virginia at Charlottesville, Virginia. In 1859, McEnery graduated from the State and National Law School in Poughkeepsie, New York. McEnery served as a lieutenant in the Confederate States Army during the Civil War.

Career
In 1866, McEnery began practicing law in Monroe. He became active in the Democratic Party, and served as its chairman in Ouachita Parish. He was elected lieutenant governor in 1879, and became Governor of Louisiana in 1881 after the death of Louis A. Wiltz. McEnery was elected to a full term as governor in 1884, but failed to be re-elected in 1888.  McEnery's administration was weak because of the power wielded by the State Treasurer Edward A. Burke and the corrupt Louisiana State Lottery Company. Despite Louisiana's Roman Catholic plurality (and majority in Acadiana and many of the southern parishes of the state), McEnery was the last Catholic to be elected governor prior to Edwin Edwards in 1972.

After losing the 1888 election, McEnery was appointed to serve as an associate justice in the Louisiana Supreme Court.  He was elected to serve in the United States Senate in 1896, serving there until his death in 1910. While in the Senate, McEnery served on the Committee of Corporations formed in the District of Columbia and the Committee of Transportation and Sale of Meat Products.

Death
McEnery died on June 28, 1910, in New Orleans and was interred there at Metairie Cemetery.

See also
List of United States Congress members who died in office (1900–49)

Notes

External links

 Retrieved on 2008-10-19
State of Louisiana - Biography
Cemetery Memorial by La-Cemeteries

Samuel D. McEnery, Late a Senator from Louisiana. US Government Printing Office. 1911.
 John and Samuel McEnery Papers at  The Historic New Orleans Collection

1837 births
1910 deaths
Confederate States Army officers
Democratic Party United States senators from Louisiana
Democratic Party governors of Louisiana
Louisiana lawyers
Justices of the Louisiana Supreme Court
Politicians from Monroe, Louisiana
Spring Hill College alumni
State and National Law School alumni
United States Naval Academy alumni
University of Virginia alumni
Burials at Metairie Cemetery
Catholics from Louisiana
19th-century American judges
19th-century American lawyers